The Remington Model Four is a semi-automatic rifle manufactured by Remington Arms from 1981 to 1987. It features a gas-operated action with a gloss-finished walnut stock. Unlike most Remington rifles, the Model Four spells out the number and is marketed as the Model Four not the Model 4.

Along with the Model 7400, the Model Four is essentially a redesign of the Model 742. Some of the improvements include a smoother action and a stronger lockup.

Variants
Model Four Collectors Edition
In 1982, 1500 Collectors Editions rifles were manufactured. This special model was chambered exclusively in .30-06 and featured an etched receiver, 24K gold inlays and a high-luster finish.

References

External links 
 Official Page

Semi-automatic rifles of the United States
Remington Arms firearms